Tieshan Subdistrict is a subdistrict in Lüshunkou District, Dalian, Liaoning, China. , it administers the following fifteen villages: 
Jiucaifang Village
Jinjia Village
Muyangcheng Village
Bailanzi Village
Duizhuanggou Village
Wangjia Village
Zhangjiagou Village
Guojia Village
Zhangjia Village
Nanyahuzui Village
Zhongyahuzui Village
Beiyahuzui Village
Yangshugou Village
Daliujia Village
Chenjia Village

See also 
 List of township-level divisions of Liaoning

References 

Township-level divisions of Liaoning
Dalian
Subdistricts of the People's Republic of China